Jeff Dunham's Very Special  Christmas Special is the third Jeff Dunham special. It was taped at Pabst Theater in Milwaukee, Wisconsin on June 7, 2008 and premiered on Comedy Central on November 16, 2008. It was released on DVD November 18, 2008.

Dunham also released his first music album, Don't Come Home for Christmas, on November 4, 2008. It contains original Christmas songs as well as a parody of "Jingle Bells" (sung by Achmed the Dead Terrorist) entitled "Jingle Bombs". All of the songs (except "Jingle Bombs") were written and accompanied by Brian Haner, who joined Dunham's act as "Guitar Guy". Bubba J made his return in this special, singing "Roadkill Christmas".

Characters
Walter
Achmed the Dead Terrorist
Bubba J
Peanut
José Jalapeño on a Stick
Sweet Daddy D (album only)

DVD release
The special was released on DVD and Blu-ray Disc.

Special features 
Censored - This film is not found in an uncensored variety, so true Dunham fans are sorely disappointed.
Holiday Tips - Walter, Achmed, and Peanut talk about tips for the holidays.
Ask Santa - Audience members ask Walter (dressed as Santa) questions.
Photo Shoot - A look at the photo shoot for the DVD cover art.
Sleigh Ride - A look at the making of the sleigh ride sequence at the beginning.
At the Show & the  Bazookas - A look at the show and outtakes. Jeff and his family shoot t-shirts into the audience.
More Jeff Dunham Stuff - An ad for jeffdunham.com

Album

Jeff Dunham released his first album entitled Don't Come Home for Christmas. The album had the same theme as the special and was released around the same time. "Jingle Bombs" and "Roadkill Christmas" were the only songs in the album that were featured in the special. Sweet Daddy D (from Arguing with Myself) also appears on the album.

Certifications and sales

References

2000s American television specials
Comedy Central original programming
Christmas television specials
2008 television specials
2008 comedy films
2008 films